Johnny Holiday is a 1949 American crime film directed by Willis Goldbeck and written by Jack Andrews, Willis Goldbeck, and Frederick Stephani. The film stars William Bendix, Stanley Clements, Hoagy Carmichael, Allen Martin Jr., Greta Granstedt, and Herbert Newcomb. The film was released on November 18, 1949, by United Artists.

Plot
Johnny Holiday (Allen Martin Jr) is a fatherless boy whose mother (Greta Granstedt) is ill in hospital. He hero-worships the psychopathic teenager Eddie Duggan (Stanley Clements). Protecting the thieving Duggan, Johnny is sent to a reformatory in Indiana, where he is taken under the wing of Sgt Walker (William Bendix), the bluff but kindly man in charge of the school farm. Walker asks for Holiday to be assigned to him when he realises that Holiday has a natural aptitude for caring for horses, as well as an innocent, sweet nature.

When Duggan turns up in the reformatory, he persuades Holiday to break out with him. At a Christmas entertainment featuring Indiana-born Hoagy Carmichael, Duggan strong-arms Holiday into an attempt at escape. Holiday faces an ethical choice between Duggan, his former hero, and Walker, who has stood by him and taken care of him, even secretly bringing him to visit his mother…

Cast 
William Bendix as Sgt Walker
Stanley Clements as Eddie Duggan
Hoagy Carmichael as Hoagy Carmichael
Allen Martin Jr as Johnny Holiday
Greta Granstedt as Mrs Holiday
Herbert Newcomb as Dr Piper
Donald Gallagher as Supt Lang
Jack Hagen as Jackson
George Cisar as Barney Duggan
Henry F. Schricker as Himself 
Leo Cleary as Trimble / Spenser
Alma Platt as Miss Kelly
Jean Juvelier as Mrs Bellini 
Buddy Cole as Buddy Cole
Staff and Boys of the Indiana Boys School as Themselves

References

External links
 

1949 films
American black-and-white films
United Artists films
1949 crime films
American crime films
Films scored by Franz Waxman
Films directed by Willis Goldbeck
1940s English-language films
1940s American films
Films shot in Indiana